Maclean Rogers (13 July 1899 – 4 January 1962) was a British film director and screenwriter.

Selected filmography

Director
 The Third Eye (1929)
 The Mayor's Nest (1932)
 Up for the Derby (1933)
 The Crime at Blossoms (1933)
 Trouble (1933)
 Summer Lightning (1933)
 It's a Cop (1934)
 Virginia's Husband (1934)
 The Scoop (1934)
 The Feathered Serpent (1934)
 The Right Age to Marry (1935)
 Old Faithful (1935)
 Marry the Girl (1935)
 A Little Bit of Bluff (1935)
 All That Glitters (1936)
 Twice Branded (1936)
 A Wife or Two (1936)
 Nothing Like Publicity (1936)
 Not So Dusty (1936)
 Busman's Holiday (1936)
 Strange Adventures of Mr. Smith (1937)
 The Heirloom Mystery (1937)
 Why Pick on Me? (1937)
 Farewell to Cinderella (1937)
 Racing Romance (1937)
 Father Steps Out (1937)
 His Lordship Regrets (1938)
 Easy Riches (1938)
 Darts Are Trumps (1938)
 Weddings Are Wonderful (1938)
 Miracles Do Happen (1939)
 His Lordship Goes to Press (1939)
 Old Mother Riley Joins Up (1940)
 Front Line Kids (1942)
 Gert and Daisy's Weekend (1942)
 Gert and Daisy Clean Up (1942)
 Variety Jubilee (1943)
 I'll Walk Beside You (1943)
 Give Me the Stars (1945)
 Don Chicago (1945)
 The Trojan Brothers (1946)
 Woman to Woman (1947)
 Calling Paul Temple (1948)
 The Story of Shirley Yorke (1948)
 Dark Secret (1949)
 Something in the City (1950)
 Old Mother Riley's Jungle Treasure (1951)
 Madame Louise (1951)
 Salute the Toff (1952)
 Hammer the Toff (1952)
 Alf's Baby (1953)
 Flannelfoot (1953)
 Johnny on the Spot (1954)
 Calling All Cars (1954)
 Assignment Redhead (1956)
 You Pay Your Money (1957)
 Not Wanted on Voyage (1957)
 Mark of the Phoenix (1958)
 A Clean Sweep (1958)
 Just Joe (1960)
 Not a Hope in Hell (1960)

Screenwriter
 God's Clay (1928)
 Glorious Youth (1929)
 Mischief (1931)

Other
 The W Plan (1930) - editor
 A Warm Corner (1930) - editor
 Tons of Money (1930) - editor
 A Night Like This (1932) - editor

References

External links

1899 births
1962 deaths
British film directors
British male screenwriters
20th-century British screenwriters